Aralasurali is a Village in Tirthahalli Taluk in Shimoga District of Karnataka State, India. It belongs to Bangalore Division . It is located 53 KM towards west from District head quarters Shivamogga. 15 KM from Tirthahalli. 325 KM from State capital Bangalore

Aralasurali is a village located in the Tirthahalli taluk of Shimoga district, Karnataka, India.

References

Villages in Shimoga district